North Chicago is one of two commuter rail stations on Metra's Union Pacific North Line located in North Chicago, Illinois. In Metra's zone-based fare system, North Chicago is located in zone G. As of 2018, North Chicago is the 168th busiest of Metra's 236 non-downtown stations, with an average of 170 weekday boardings. 

The station consists of two side platforms which serve two tracks. An unstaffed station house is on the inbound (east) platform. Parking is available at North Chicago in a city-owned lot on the west side of the tracks. North Chicago is little more than a shelter, though it is served regularly.

As of April 25, 2022, North Chicago is served by 23 trains in each direction on weekdays, by 11 trains in each direction on Saturdays, and by eight trains in each direction on Sundays.

Bus connections
Pace

Abbott's Platform
Abbott's Platform was a limited-service commuter rail station on Metra's Chicago–Kenosha line in North Chicago. Unlike other stops, Abbott's Platform was not given its own listing on timetables. Instead, service to this location was indicated by arrival times for North Chicago marked with a "J" note. The stop was closed in 1986.

References

External links
 Metra - North Chicago

Metra stations in Illinois
Former Chicago and North Western Railway stations
North Chicago, Illinois
Railway stations in Lake County, Illinois
Union Pacific North Line